Enrique Ojeda (6 March 1904 – 1968) was a Chilean sports shooter. He competed at the 1936 Summer Olympics and 1952 Summer Olympics.

References

External links

1904 births
1968 deaths
Chilean male sport shooters
Olympic shooters of Chile
Shooters at the 1936 Summer Olympics
Shooters at the 1952 Summer Olympics
20th-century Chilean people